Hjálparfoss is one of several waterfalls in the south of Iceland situated in the lava fields north of the stratovolcano Hekla near the point where the rivers Fossá and Þjórsá join.

Just downstream from Hjálparfoss is Iceland's second-largest hydroelectric power station, Búrfellsstöð.

See also
 Waterfalls of Iceland
 List of waterfalls

External links

 Information on Búrfellsstöð from Landsvirkjun (in Icelandic)
 Images of Hjálparfoss on Flickr

Waterfalls of Iceland